F15 or F-15 may refer to:

Aircraft
 McDonnell Douglas F-15 Eagle, an American-designed air-superiority fighter aircraft
 McDonnell Douglas F-15E Strike Eagle, an all weather strike fighter derived from the F-15 Eagle
 McDonnell Douglas F-15 STOL/MTD, a modified variant of the F-15 Eagle
 Northrop F-15 Reporter, a photo-reconnaissance variant of the P-61 Black Widow

Video games
 F-15 City Wars, a 1990 video game developed by American Video Entertainment on Nintendo
 F-15 Strike Eagle (video game), a 1984 video game
 F-15 Strike Eagle II, a 1989 video game
 F-15 Strike Eagle III, a 1993 video game
 Jane's F-15, a 1998 video game

Other uses
 BMW X5 (F15), a mid-size luxury crossover SUV
 F15 and F15A, the two Ford 15-hundredweight versions of the World War II Canadian Military Pattern trucks
 February 15, 2003 anti-war protest
 Fluorine-15 (F-15 or 15F), an isotope of fluorine
 F15, a function key